

Highest-grossing films

List of films
A list of films produced in Japan in 2011 (see 2011 in film):

References

 2011 in Japan
 2011 in Japanese television
 List of 2011 box office number-one films in Japan

2011
Japanese
Films